Adelphostigma occipitalis is a species of snake in the family Colubridae. It is widely distribution in South America and occurs from northeastern Peru and Colombia south and east to large parts of Brazil, Bolivia, Paraguay, Uruguay, and northern Argentina. It is oviparous.

References

External links 
 Taeniophallus occipitalis at catalogueoflife.org

Adelphostigma
Reptiles described in 1863
Taxa named by Giorgio Jan
Snakes of South America
Reptiles of Argentina
Reptiles of Bolivia
Reptiles of Brazil
Reptiles of Colombia
Reptiles of Paraguay
Reptiles of Uruguay